Anton Demkov (born 6 August 1995) is a Belarusian professional footballer.

References

External links 
 
 
 Profile at pressball.by

1995 births
Living people
Sportspeople from Brest, Belarus
Belarusian footballers
Association football midfielders
FC Dynamo Brest players
FC Kobrin players
FC UAS Zhitkovichi players
FC Rukh Brest players
FC Volna Pinsk players
FC Ivatsevichi players